Elizabeth Jean Spriggs (18 September 1929 – 2 July 2008) was an English character actress.

Spriggs' roles with the Royal Shakespeare Company included Nurse in Romeo and Juliet, Gertrude in Hamlet and Beatrice in Much Ado About Nothing. In 1978, she won the Olivier Award for Best Supporting Actress for Arnold Wesker's Love Letters on Blue Paper. She received a BAFTA nomination for Best Supporting Actress for the 1995 film Sense and Sensibility. Her other films included Richard's Things (1980), Impromptu (1991), Paradise Road (1997) and Harry Potter and the Philosopher's Stone (2001).

Early life and career
Born in Buxton, Derbyshire, in 1929, Spriggs had an unhappy childhood, later stating that she "grew up entirely without affection". She studied at the Royal College of Music and taught speech and drama in Coventry. Her first marriage at 21 was a disaster and, in what she called "the most painful decision of my life", left her husband and young daughter to pursue her acting dream. "The desire to act was like a weight within me", she later said, "and I knew if I didn't do anything about it, it would destroy me". She wrote to a repertory company in Stockport, Cheshire, asking for a job and was taken on. She worked with many companies, including in Birmingham and Bristol, before joining the Royal Shakespeare Company (RSC) in 1962.

Stage career
Spriggs was a regular performer with the RSC under Peter Hall until 1976, playing many important Shakespearean roles, including Nurse in Romeo and Juliet, an acclaimed Gertrude in Hamlet opposite David Warner, Calpurnia in Julius Caesar, Mistress Ford in The Merry Wives of Windsor and a witty Beatrice in Much Ado About Nothing. She also featured in RSC productions of Edward Albee's A Delicate Balance, Shaw's Major Barbara and Dion Boucicault's comedy London Assurance, playing Lady Gay Spanker alongside Donald Sinden.

In 1976, she moved with Hall from the RSC to the National Theatre when the company's own theatre opened. In the first season she played the eccentric medium Madame Arcati in Blithe Spirit. Among her many other plays for the National were Volpone with Paul Scofield, The Country Wife and Macbeth with Albert Finney. In 1978, Spriggs won the Society of West End Theatre Award for Best Supporting Actress for Arnold Wesker's Love Letters on Blue Paper, playing the wife of a dying trade union leader who recalls their early life together (a part she first played on BBC television in 1976).

Her later stage work included a West End revival of J. B. Priestley's When We Are Married in 1986, and Arsenic and Old Lace at the Chichester Festival Theatre in 1991.

Television and film
Spriggs did not work regularly on television until the mid-1970s. She was in Frederic Raphael's The Glittering Prizes (1976), starred as Eleanor Pressett in the BBC drama We, the Accused (1980), played Connie, the head of a battling South London family in the thirteen-part drama Fox (1980), was Martha in Tales Of The Unexpected (1980) and was the formidable Nan in the ITV comedy series Shine on Harvey Moon (1982–85). She appeared in three plays by Alan Bennett: Afternoon Off (1979), Intensive Care (1982) and Our Winnie (1982). She played Calpurnia and Mistress Quickly for the BBC's Shakespeare series, appeared in Doctor Who in the 1987 Sylvester McCoy serial Paradise Towers and was the title witch in a children's series called Simon and the Witch (1987).

In 1990, she gave a memorable performance as one of the God-fearing gossips in the BBC adaptation of Jeanette Winterson's Oranges Are Not the Only Fruit and in 1992, was in television versions of Kingsley Amis's The Old Devils and Angus Wilson's Anglo-Saxon Attitudes. In 1994, she played the midwife Mrs Gamp in the BBC's adaptation of Charles Dickens's Martin Chuzzlewit and was Mrs Cadwallader in Middlemarch by George Eliot. She continued to work on television, in series like Heartbeat, Midsomer Murders (playing a murder victim in the pilot episode of the series in 1997 and returning in 2006 as the character's identical twin sister) and Poirot.

She was the subject of This Is Your Life in 1998, when she was surprised by Michael Aspel at Shepperton Studios.

Her early film appearances included Work Is a Four-Letter Word (1968) and Three into Two Won't Go (1969), both directed by Peter Hall. Her later character roles included Mrs Jennings in Emma Thompson's Oscar-winning adaptation of Sense and Sensibility (1995), a role for which she was nominated for a BAFTA Award for Best Actress in a Supporting Role (losing out to co-star Kate Winslet) and the Fat Lady in Harry Potter and the Philosopher's Stone (2001). Her final film was Is Anybody There? (2008) with Michael Caine, released shortly after her death.

Personal life

Spriggs's first two marriages, to Kenneth Spriggs and a fellow RSC actor, Marshall Jones, were dissolved. In 1977, she married her third husband, Murray Manson, a mini-cab driver and musician whom she had met while performing in London Assurance. She had a daughter, Wendy, from her first marriage.

Spriggs died on 2 July 2008 aged 78. Her funeral service and interment took place at Saint Mary the Virgin's Churchyard in Thame, Oxfordshire. It was attended by family and friends, including, Sinéad Cusack, James Ellis and Lesley Sharp. Her funeral was also attended by Jeremy Irons, Robert Hardy, and Peter Vaughan, who all paid tribute to their friend and fellow actor.

Selected filmography and Television

References

External links
 

 

1929 births
2008 deaths
20th-century English actresses
21st-century English actresses
Actresses from Derbyshire
English film actresses
English stage actresses
English television actresses
English voice actresses
People from Buxton
People from Oxford
Laurence Olivier Award winners
Royal Shakespeare Company members